Alyssa Howard was the pseudonym used by Eileen Buckholtz, Ruth Glick, Carolyn Males and Louise Titchener writing together.

Publications under this name
 Love is Elected (1982) 
 Southern Persuasion (1983)

References

Collective pseudonyms
20th-century pseudonymous writers
Pseudonymous women writers